BTV may refer to:

Television channels, stations and networks

Bangladesh
Bangladesh Television, a state-owned TV broadcaster in Bangladesh and country's oldest television network

Botswana
Botswana TV, national broadcaster in Botswana
Botswana TV, targeted for adults. Normally airs government issues like National Development Plans (NDPs),  economics, etc.
Botswana TV 3 focuses on tourism, cultural shows etc.

Bulgaria
bTV (Bulgaria), a major national television channel in Bulgaria
bTV Lady, a Bulgarian television channel targeted at a female audience
bTV Action, a Bulgarian action show television channel
bTV Cinema, a Bulgarian television channel, showing movies and serials
bTV Comedy, a Bulgarian television channel, formerly GTV, featuring comedy programs

United States
Bloomberg Television (BTV), a business news channel
Binghamton Television, the student television station of Binghamton University, Vestal, New York

Other television networks/channels/stations, by country
BTV, the former callsign of VTV a TV station in Ballarat in Victoria, which is a state of Australia
Beijing Television, a series of channels in China
Bloomsbury Television, the student television channel of University College London, England
BTV (Indonesia), a television network in Indonesia
BTV (Lithuania), a television station in Lithuania
BTV, a television station in Mongolia
BTV, known as Birgunj Television Channel, Nepal
Bergens Tidende TV, a local television station in Norway
Basketball TV, a Philippine all-basketball channel
Benfica TV, the television channel of sports club S.L. Benfica in Portugal

Other uses
Basic Transportation Vehicle, or Basic Utility Vehicle (BUV), a low-cost vehicle intended for developing countries
Bluetongue Virus, the virus that causes the Bluetongue disease
BlogTV, a now defunct live broadcasting website
Brake to Vacate, an aircraft landing device introduced by Airbus
BTV Cup, Binh Duong Television Cup, an international friendly football cup held in Vietnam
Burlington International Airport in Vermont, United States (IATA code)